is a Japanese footballer who plays for Kyoto Sanga FC.

Career
After being raised by Kyoto Sanga youth ranks, Wakahara was promoted to the top team in November 2017.

Career statistics
Updated to 20 July 2022.

References

External links
 Tomoya Wakahara at J. League Data Site 
 Tomoya Wakahara at J.LEAGUE.jp (archive) 
 Tomoya Wakahara at Kyoto Sanga FC (archived) 

1999 births
Living people
Association football people from Shiga Prefecture
Japanese footballers
Japan youth international footballers
Association football goalkeepers
Kyoto Sanga FC players
J1 League players
J2 League players